Phelim Drew (born 1969) is an Irish actor.

Drew is the son of the Irish folk singer Ronnie Drew, one of the founders of The Dubliners. He graduated at Gaiety School of Acting. In 1989, Phelim Drew gave his debut, as an actor in My Left Foot: The Story of Christy Brown.

Phelim Drew is married to actress and comedian Sue Collins. They are parents of four children.

Filmography

External links 

http://www.independent.ie/style/celebrity/celebrity-features/actor-phelim-drew-i-miss-the-love-of-my-parents-30493094.html

Irish male film actors
Irish male television actors
Living people
1969 births
Place of birth missing (living people)